Fanny: The Right to Rock is a Canadian documentary film, directed by Bobbi Jo Hart and released in 2021. The film is a profile of Fanny, an all-female rock band from the 1970s whose members included lesbian music pioneer June Millington.

The film premiered at the 2021 Hot Docs Canadian International Documentary Festival, where it was named one of five winners of the Rogers Audience Award. It was subsequently screened at the 2021 Inside Out Film and Video Festival, where it won the award for Best Canadian Film.

Reception
Dennis Harvey of Variety wrote "Fanny: The Right to Rock remains thoroughly engaging thanks to the demonstrable talent and brassy forthrightness of its central personalities".

Sydney Urbanek of The Spool said "The beauty of Fanny: The Right to Rock is that it's being released now-long enough since their peak that the band can tell their story on their own terms, and early enough that they're very much around to receive their long-overdue flowers".

Susan G. Cole of Point of View magazine criticized the film for its omissions, such as not mentioning the Riot grrrl movement.

References

External links

2021 documentary films
2021 films
2021 LGBT-related films
Canadian documentary films
Canadian LGBT-related films
Documentary films about musical groups
Documentary films about lesbians
2020s English-language films
2020s Canadian films